Oru Park Landscape Conservation Area is a nature park which is located in Ida-Viru County, Estonia.

The protected area was founded in 1957 to protect Toila-Oru Park (a part of Saka-Ontika-Toila Limestone Shore). In 1997, the protected area was designated to the landscape conservation area.

References

Nature reserves in Estonia
Geography of Ida-Viru County